Juurile is a town in the Bari region of Puntland in northeastern Somalia, situated on the Garowe-Bosaso Highway,  south of Bosaso.

Education

Juurile has a number of schools, according to Puntland ministry of education, there are two primary and intermediate schools in Juurile.

Location
Juurile is located at 10.38350° N, 49.07134° E

See also

 Juurile, Bari, Somalia

References 

Bari, Somalia